Picture This is the second album by American rock band Huey Lewis and the News, released in 1982. The album brought the band their first top-ten hit, "Do You Believe in Love". It remained on the Billboard albums chart for 35 weeks and peaked at number 7.

Background 
The band produced the album themselves along with their manager, Bob Brown. Several outside tunes were included on the album. One of these tunes was "Do You Believe in Love", written by Robert John "Mutt" Lange. It was released as the album's first single and became the band's breakthrough hit, reaching the top ten of the Billboard Hot 100 singles chart. The follow-up single, "Hope You Love Me Like You Say You Do", reached the top 40; while the third single, "Workin' for a Livin'", peaked at number 41.

"Tattoo (Giving It All Up for Love)" is a cover of a Phil Lynott song. Lynott was the singer and bassist for the hard rock group Thin Lizzy, and Huey Lewis had played harmonica on Lynott's first two solo albums, as well as Thin Lizzy's Live and Dangerous album. "Buzz Buzz Buzz" is a cover of a song from 1957 by The Hollywood Flames. "The Only One" was based on a real classmate in Lewis' junior high school who met an end similar to the person in the song. "He was a very cool kid" said Lewis. "Janey" in the song was also based on the classmate's girlfriend, though her name was changed and Lewis does not know of her true fate after her boyfriend's death.

Track listing

Personnel 

Huey Lewis and the News
 Huey Lewis – vocals
 Chris Hayes – lead guitar, backing vocals
 Johnny Colla – rhythm guitar, saxophone, backing vocals
 Mario Cipollina – bass
 Bill Gibson – drums, percussion, backing vocals
 Sean Hopper – keyboards, backing vocals

Additional personnel
 Tower of Power – brass

Production 
 Huey Lewis and the News – producers
 Bob Brown – executive producer
 Jim Gaines – recording engineer
 Maureen Droney – assistant engineer
 Mark Deadman – sound engineer
 Bob Clearmountain – mixing at The Power Station (New York, NY).
 Bob Ludwig – mastering at Masterdisk (New York, NY).
 Janet Levinson – art direction
 Hugh Brown – photography
 Norman Moore – logo

Charts

Singles

Certifications

References

External links
 
 

1982 albums
Huey Lewis and the News albums
Chrysalis Records albums